Kaykaus ibn Kaykhusraw or Kayka'us II (ʿIzz ad-Dīn Kaykāwus ibn Kaykhusraw) was the sultan of the Seljuqs of Rûm from 1246 until 1262.

Life
Kaykaus was the eldest of three sons of Kaykhusraw II. His mother was Prodoulia, who was ethnically Byzantine Greek. He was a youth at the time of his father's death in 1246 and could do little to prevent the Mongol conquest of Anatolia. For most of his tenure as the Seljuq Sultan of Rûm, he shared the throne with one or both of his brothers, Kilij Arslan IV and Kayqubad II. Mongol commander Baiju threatened him and warned him of being late with paying tribute and requested new pastures in Anatolia for the Mongol cavalry. The Mongols defeated Kaykaus who then fled to the Byzantine empire in 1256. The Byzantine court detained him, though, they welcomed him as usual. So Kaykaus's brother Kayqubad appealed to Berke Khan of the Golden Horde. Nogai invaded the Empire in 1265 and released him and his men after Emperor Michael VIII Palaiologos detained an envoy from Cairo to Berke. Berke gave Kaykaus appanage in Crimea and had him married to his daughter, Urbay Khatun.  He died an exile in 1279 or 1280 in Crimea.

According to Rustam Shukurov, Kaykaus II "had dual Christian and Muslim identity, an identity which was further complicated by dual Turkic/Persian and Greek ethnic identity".

Legacy

Though deposed and exiled, Kaykaus remained popular among the Turkmen of Anatolia and a threat to the stability of the fragile Seljuq-Mongol relationship. The vizier Fakhr al-Din Ali was imprisoned for a time in 1271 for corresponding with him. It was from Kaykaus that Karamanoğlu Mehmed Bey in 1276 sought help in his uprising against the Mongols. Since Kaykaus was in no position to help, Mehmed Bey thought it best to have a representative of Kaykaus’ line on his side, even if only an imposter, and named Jimri as head of the revolt. Kaykaus later dispatched several of his sons from the Crimea as pretenders, one of which, Masud II, was ultimately successful in winning the Seljuq throne in 1280. 

Some modern historians consider the Byzantine noble Athanasios Soultanos to have been the brother or son of Kaykaus, but this is unlikely due to the later age Soultanos lived in. However another branch of the Christianized aristocratic family of the Soultanoi was indeed begun by a close relative of Kaykaus, whence their name.

In the Ottoman period the rebel Sheikh Bedreddin, who drew support largely from Turkmen migrants to the Balkans, claimed descent from Kaykaus II.

See also
Anatolian Seljuks family tree

References

Sources
 
Claude Cahen, Pre-Ottoman Turkey: a general survey of the material and spiritual culture and history, trans. J. Jones-Williams, (New York: Taplinger, 1968) 271–279.

External links
 
 

13th-century births
1270s deaths
Sultans of Rum
Seljuk dynasty
13th-century Turkic people
People from the Seljuk Empire of Greek descent